The 6-inch/47 caliber Mark 16 gun was used in the main batteries of several pre-war and World War II US Navy light cruisers. They were primarily mounted in triple turrets and used against surface targets.
The Mark 16DP gun was a dual purpose fitting of the Mark 16 for use against aircraft as well as surface ships. It was installed in the post-war  light cruisers and the anti-aircraft gunnery training ship .

Design
Three versions of this breech loading rifled naval gun were produced, the 6-inch/47 Mark 16 Mod 0, the 6-inch/47 Mark 16 Mod 1, and 6-inch/47 Mark 17. "Mark 16" indicates it is the 16th design in the series of US Navy 6-inch guns. "Mod 0" or "Mod 1" indicates minor modifications to the design, with 0 being the original and 1 being the first modification (which in this case was a tapered liner).

The 6-inch/47 caliber gun was one of several weapons developed by the United States Navy in the 1930s to fire "super-heavy" armor-piercing (AP) projectiles, thus increasing warships' destructive power while complying with the limits on number of guns and ship size by the London Naval Treaty. Compared with the preceding 6-inch/53 caliber gun, the 6-inch/47 Mark 16 fired a  AP projectile instead of a  AP projectile.

The guns were mounted in three types of turret.

The Mark 16 was primarily mounted in a triple turret for use against surface targets. All three guns in each turret were mounted in the same sleeve and thus elevated together, but delay coils permitted "split salvos" to be fired; this cured a shell pattern dispersion problem common to many US cruisers of the 1920s and 1930s. The  had 12 guns mounted in four triple turrets. The arrangement in triple turrets on the ships' centerlines allowed the use of all guns in a broadside; the  light cruisers of the 1920s also mounted twelve 6-inch/53 guns but could only use eight in a broadside due to eight of the guns being mounted singly in  casemates which could only fire to one side of the ships.

The Mark 16DP used a two-gun semi-automatic "Dual Purpose" turret, for use against both air and surface targets. They were individually sleeved to allow independent elevation. They were produced in limited numbers late in World War II. The DP turret could fire more quickly and elevate and train faster compared to the "single purpose" triple turret. The Worcester-class used these mountings. These were not entirely satisfactory, and a triple DP mounting was proposed to replace them, but was cancelled after World War II.

The Mark 16/16DP gun could fire a  projectile  at an elevation of 22.3 degrees with a flight time of 44.7 seconds. Projectiles varied in weight; an armor-piercing projectile weighed 130 pounds, while a high-capacity (HC) projectile weighed 105 pounds. Ammunition was semi-fixed (the projectile and the powder casing were separate). The HC projectile could be equipped with mechanical time (MT) or, by late 1942, with variable time (VT) radio proximity fuzes for use against aircraft.

The Mark 34 high-explosive shell this gun fired is usually referred to as "HC", but, when fitted with a proximity (VT) fuse or a mechanical time (MT) fuse, it could be used against aircraft and thus was technically an "AA" projectile in that configuration. Thus the Mark 34 HC is also in theory the Mark 34 AA, depending on the fuse fitted.

Eight to ten rounds per minute could be fired from each of the 6-inch guns. Originally gun ports in the turret faces were cut to allow only 41 degrees elevation, though during World War II all triple 6-inch/47 gun ports were ordered to be modified to permit the full 60 degrees. The guns could only be loaded at between −5 degrees and +20 degrees elevation; this reduced the rate of fire when engaging distant surface targets or aircraft.

Gun barrel lives were 750 to 1050 full-charge rounds.

The Mark 17 was used in a single pedestal Mark 18 mount. The Mark 17 gun could fire a  Common shell (HE) projectile  at an elevation of 20 degrees. Ammunition was bagged (the projectile and the powder bag were separate). The Erie-class mounted four guns in single pedestal mounts.

Five to eight rounds per minute could be fired from each of the 6-inch guns.

Gun barrel lives were 750 to 1050 full-charge rounds.

Mounts
The "Mark 16" designation refers to the gun being 16th in the 6-inch series of designs, not the turret the gun is mounted in. Smaller guns at that time had a Mark number for the type of mounting. In modern times the US Navy refers primarily to the Mark number of the gun mount (turret), but in World War II the model of the gun was the primary reference point. The gun turrets for most 6-inch and larger guns of the 1920s through 1945 were known according to the class of ship the turret was to be mounted on.

The turret rested on a barbette or circular shaft that extended several decks into the ship. Projectiles were stored in a projectile-handling room in the lower part of the barbette. Two-hundred projectiles, per gun, could be stored in the projectile-handling room. The guns were supplied with projectiles via hoists.

Powder stores were below the projectile-handling room and powder hoists fed the guns. Empty powder canisters were ejected from the turret via an ejector port at the back of the turret. When the guns were firing, it was not unusual to see empty brass canisters piling up on the deck behind the turret. The turret itself had  of armor plate on its face and could train (turn) to follow its target at ten degrees a second.

Each turret required a crew of 3 officers and 52 enlisted men.

Use

Weapons of comparable role, performance and era
 BL 6 inch Mk XXIII naval gun : British equivalent light cruiser gun
 15 cm SK C/25 : German equivalent light cruiser gun but firing a lighter shell at higher velocity
 15 cm SK C/28 : approximate German equivalent
 152 mm /55 Italian naval gun Models 1934 and 1936 : approximate Italian equivalent
 15.5 cm/60 3rd Year Type naval gun : approximate Japanese equivalent

Surviving examples
Today one of the few 6-inch triple gun turrets left in the world is on the museum ship , which is located in the Buffalo and Erie County Naval & Military Park in Buffalo, New York.

References

This article includes text from public information on display on the Museum ship , which is located in the Buffalo and Erie County Naval & Military Park in Buffalo, New York.

Naval anti-aircraft guns
World War II naval weapons
Naval guns of the United States
152 mm artillery
Military equipment introduced in the 1930s